Mickaël Debève (born 1 December 1970) is a former French footballer who played as a midfielder and manager.

Football career
Born in Abbeville, Debève began his career at Toulouse FC; after a slow start - only four first-team appearances in three seasons, he became a main squad member. His first match in the top level came on 5 June 1987, in a 1–0 home win against RC Lens.

The most important part of Debève's career was spent at Lens, who he helped win the national league in 1998, adding the league cup the following year. In the 1998–99 UEFA Champions League, he scored the game's only goal at Wembley, against English champions Arsenal, making Lens the first club from France to win at that ground.

After totalling more than 400 official matches in his country, Debève moved to England with Middlesbrough FC in February 2002, arriving for free and rejoining former Lens mate Franck Queudrue. He made his debut as a substitute in the FA Cup 6th round victory over Everton. He was then thrust into the starting line up for the semi final against Arsenal due to various injuries, making only his second Boro appearance against the team he had knocked out of the UEFA Champions League four years earlier. However, he could not prevent Boro losing 1–0. He left in the summer, and closed out his career in France's second level, with SC Amiens.

Managerial career
Immediately after retiring, Debève became a manager, starting as player-coach with hometown side SC Abbevillois Football.

Debève was named manager of Toulouse, the club where he started his playing career, on 23 January 2018, replacing Pascal Dupraz. Upon his appointment, Toulouse was 19th in Ligue 1 on 20 points from 22 matches (5 wins, 5 draws, 12 losses), and facing relegation. In his first match in charge of Toulouse, they lost 2–0 away to Bourg-en-Bresse in the 2017-18 Coupe de France Round of 32.

References

External links

1970 births
Living people
Sportspeople from Abbeville
French footballers
Association football midfielders
Toulouse FC players
RC Lens players
Le Havre AC players
Amiens SC players
SC Abbeville players
Middlesbrough F.C. players
Ligue 1 players
Ligue 2 players
Premier League players
French expatriate footballers
Expatriate footballers in England
French football managers
Toulouse FC managers
Ligue 1 managers
France youth international footballers
Footballers from Hauts-de-France
French expatriate sportspeople in England
Association football coaches